Cassie Chambers Armstrong is an American politician who is a member of the Democratic Party representing District 19 in the Kentucky Senate since March 2, 2023. A former member of the Louisville Metro Council, she served from January 1, 2021 until she won a special election on February 21, 2023 to fill the state Senate vacancy left by U.S. Representative Morgan McGarvey.

References 

Living people
21st-century American politicians
21st-century American women politicians
Democratic Party Kentucky state senators
Women state legislators in Kentucky

Place of birth missing (living people)
Year of birth missing (living people)
Yale University alumni
Alumni of the London School of Economics
Harvard Law School alumni